Yobe State University is located in Damaturu, Yobe State, Nigeria. It was established under the Yobe state law in 2006 by Alh. Bukar Abba Ibrahim, the then Executive Governor of Yobe State(1999-2007).

Programmes 
Yobe State University offers courses at both undergraduate and postgraduate levels. The postgraduate courses offered by the institution at Postgraduate Diploma, Masters and PhD. levels are listed below.

Undergraduate programmes
   Accountancy 
   Agriculture
   Anatomy
   Arabic Studies
   Biological Science(s)
   Business Administration
   Business Education
   Biochemistry
   Chemistry
   Computer Science
   Economics
   Education and Biology
   Education and Chemistry
   Education and Economics
   Education and English Language
   Education and Geography
   Education and History
   Education and Islamic Studies
   Education and Physics
   Education Arts
   English Language
   Geography
   Geology and mining
   Hausa
   History
   Islamic Studies
   Shari'a Law
   Civil law
   Mathematics
   Medicine and surgery
   Microbiology
   Physics
   Pharmacy 
   Political Science
   Public Administration
   Physiology
   Sociology and Anthropology
   Statistics
   Linguistics (English)
   Linguistics(Arabic)
   Linguistics(Hausa)

Yobe State University postgraduate programmes.
 M.A. Arabic (3 semesters)
 PhD. Arabic (4 semesters)
 M.A. Islamic Studies (3 semesters)
 PhD Islamic Studies (4 semesters)
 M.A. (Ed.) English Language Education (4 semesters)
 PhD. English Language Education (6 semesters)
 PGD Chemistry (2 semesters)
 M.Sc. Chemistry (3 semesters)
 PhD. Chemistry (6 semesters)
 PGD GIS and Remote Sensing (2 semesters)
 M.Sc. GIS and Remote Sensing (4 semesters)
 PhD. GIS and Remote Sensing (6 semesters)
 M.Sc. Geography (4 semesters)
 PhD. Geography (6 semesters)
 PGD Management (2 semesters)
 M.Sc. Management (4 semesters)
 PhD. Management (6 semesters)
 PhD. Marketing (6 semesters)
 PGD Public Policy and Administration (2 semesters)
 PGD Banking and Finance (2 semesters)
 PGD Education (2 semesters)
 PGD Accounting (2 semesters)
 PGD Food Quality and Safety (2 semesters) 
 PGD Local Government Administration (2 semesters)

See also 
Academic libraries in Nigeria

References

External links
Yobe State University official website
  Yobe State University Teaching Hospital official website

2006 establishments in Nigeria
Damaturu
Educational institutions established in 2006
Universities and colleges in Nigeria
Academic libraries in Nigeria